Marianne Binder-Keller (born 15 June 1985) is a Swiss communications expert and politician of Christian Democratic People’s Party (CVP). She is a member of the National Council and president of CVP Aargau.

Life and career 
Binder-Keller’s father Anton Keller is a politician and former CVP national councilor from Canton Aargau. Her mother Rosemary Keller is a writer. Binder-Keller is married to Andreas Binder, a member of the CVP. Their son is a co-president of the CVP in the city of Baden. Binder-Keller is a communications professional. She was head of communications of CVP Switzerland and president of CVP in Baden District since 2015. she became president of CVP for the Canton Aargau in 2016. She was elected to the Grand Council of the Canton of Aargau in 2013 and served in the council until 2019, when she was elected to the National Council. Her legislative interest focuses on economic framework, ethical issues and job security.

References 

Living people
Swiss politicians
Christian Democratic People's Party of Switzerland politicians
1985 births